Petats is an Austronesian language spoken by a few thousand persons in Papua New Guinea. Dialects are Hitau-Pororan, Matsungan, and Sumoun.

Grammar
Verbal inflection is accomplished through post verbal pronominal particles which carry tense and mood marking.

Resources
 Global Recordings Network Petats
 Jerry Allen and Matthew Beaso. 1975. Petats Phonemes and Orthography
 Petats Organised Phonology Data
 Materials on Petats are included in the open access Arthur Capell collections (AC1 and AC2) and the Malcolm Ross collection (MR1) held by Paradisec.

References

Northwest Solomonic languages
Languages of Papua New Guinea
Languages of the Autonomous Region of Bougainville